The Putra Mosque is the principal mosque of Putrajaya, Malaysia. Construction of the mosque began in 1997 and was completed two years later.

It is located on Putra Square and is adjacent to man-made Putrajaya Lake. 

The pink-domed Putra Mosque is constructed with rose-tinted granite and consists of three main functional areas – the prayer hall, the Sahn, or courtyard, and various learning facilities and function rooms. The mosque can accommodate 15,000 worshippers at any one time.

Photo Gallery

See also
 Islam in Malaysia
 List of tallest minarets

References

Mosques in Putrajaya
1999 establishments in Malaysia
Mosques completed in 1999
Mosque buildings with domes
20th-century architecture in Malaysia